No. 318 "City of Gdańsk" Polish Fighter-Reconnaissance Squadron was a Polish tactical reconnaissance aircraft squadron formed in Great Britain as part of an agreement between the Polish Government in Exile and the United Kingdom in 1940. It was one of several Polish squadrons fighting alongside the Royal Air Force (RAF) during World War II.

History

Formation and training 
The squadron was formed on 20 March 1943 at RAF Detling, Kent from personnel of No. 309 Squadron and after training with Hawker Hurricane Mk.Is it moved to the Middle East, operating from RAF Muqeibila and RAF Gaza and continuing its training, specifically with II Corps of the Polish Army, by now using Hurricane Mk.IIBs. Training went on until 1944, when the squadron converted to Supermarine Spitfires.

Operations in Italy 
The squadron was then involved in ground attack and tactical reconnaissance operations over Italy in support of the Eighth Army following the allied advance; and saw action at the Battle of Monte Cassino. After hostilities ceased the squadron remained in Italy for another year, but on 15 August 1946 it handed over its aircraft and left Italy for the UK, where it arrived on the 19th. Soon after, the squadron disbanded at RAF Coltishall, according to some sources on 31 August 1946, while others mention 12 December 1946.

Aircraft operated

Squadron bases

Commanding officers

See also 
 Polish Air Forces in Great Britain
 Polish contribution to World War II

References

Notes

Bibliography 

 Delve, Ken. The Source Book of the RAF. Shrewsbury, Shropshire, UK: Airlife Publishing, 1994. .
 Flintham, Vic and Andrew Thomas. Combat Codes: A full explanation and listing of British, Commonwealth and Allied air force unit codes since 1938. Shrewsbury, Shropshire, UK: Airlife Publishing Ltd., 2003. .
 
 
 Król, Waclaw. Zarys dzialan polskiego lotnictwa w Wielkiej Brytanii 1940-1945 (in Polish). Warszawa, Poland: Biblioteczka Skrzydlatej Polski, tom 11, Wydawnictwa Komunikacji i lacznosci, 1981. .
 Lake, Alan. Flying Units of the RAF: The ancestry, formation and disbandment of all flying units from 1912. Shrewsbury, Shropshire, UK: Airlife Publishing, 1999. .
 Rawlings, John D.R. Coastal, Support and Special Squadrons of the RAF and their Aircraft. London: Jane's Publishing Company Ltd., 1982. .
 Sturtivant, Ray, ISO and John Hamlin. RAF Flying Training And Support Units since 1912. Tonbridge, Kent, UK: Air-Britain (Historians) Ltd., 2007. .

External links 

 No.318 Squadron history on the official RAF website
 No 318 (Danzig) Squadron on Air of Authority - A History of RAF Organisation
 No.318 Squadron history as in "Destiny can wait"
 Personnel of the Polish Air Force in Great Britain 1940-1947

318
No. 318
318
Reconnaissance units and formations of the Royal Air Force
Military units and formations established in 1943
Military units and formations disestablished in 1946
Military units and formations in Mandatory Palestine in World War II